The ECAC Hockey Best Defensive Defenseman is an annual award given out at the conclusion of the ECAC Hockey regular season to the best defensive forward in the conference as voted by the coaches of each ECAC team.

The 'Outstanding Defenseman' was first awarded in 1962 but discontinued following the 1967 season. After 25 years of retirement the award was rekindled as the 'Best Defensive Defenseman' in the same year that the Best Defensive Forward was inaugurated (1993). It has since been conferred each year.

Only one player (Mike Traggio) has won the award more than once. The award has been split twice in its history, 1996–97  and 2013–14 .

Award winners

Winners by school

See also
ECAC Hockey Awards

References

General

Specific

External links
ECAC Hockey Awards (Incomplete)

College ice hockey trophies and awards in the United States